The 2015 Korean FA Cup, known as the 2015 KEB Hana Bank FA Cup, was the 20th edition of the Korean FA Cup. FC Seoul became champions and qualified for the 2016 AFC Champions League.

Schedule

Prize money

Teams

Qualifying rounds
The draw for the qualifying rounds was held on 27 February 2015.

First round
The first round was held on 28 March 2015.

Second round
The second round was held on 4 April 2015.

Third round
The third round was held on 11 and 12 April 2015.

Final rounds

Bracket

Round of 32
The draw for the round of 32 was held on 16 April 2015. It was played on 29 April and 12–13 May 2015.

Round of 16
The draw for the round of 16 was held on 28 May 2015. The matches were played on 24 June 2015.

Quarter-finals
The draw for the quarter-finals was held on 28 May 2015. The matches were played on 22 July 2015.

Semi-finals
The draw for the semi-finals was held on 24 September 2015. The matches were played on 14 October 2015.

Final

Awards

Main awards

Man of the Round

See also
2015 in South Korean football
2015 K League Classic
2015 K League Challenge
2015 Korea National League
2015 K3 League

References

External links
Official website 
Regulations at KFA 

Korean FA Cup seasons
2015 in South Korean football